The Ozinie, also known as the Wicomiss, were a group of Native Americans living near modern-day Rock Hall, Maryland at the time that John Smith visited in 1608. The had an estimated population of 255 people. They were an Algonquian-language tribe and were related to the Nanticoke, another Algonquian-language tribe, who they assimilated with in the 1660s.

References 

Eastern Algonquian peoples
Extinct Native American tribes
Kent County, Maryland
Native American history of Maryland
Native American tribes in Maryland